Kahi Badi Forest Park is a forest park in the Gambia. Established on January 1, 1954, it covers 1485 hectares.

The estimate terrain elevation above sea level is 45 metres.

References
  

Protected areas established in 1954
Forest parks of the Gambia